Edward Nygma, commonly known as The Riddler, is a fictional character who appears in Joel Schumacher's 1995 superhero film Batman Forever. Based upon the DC Comics character and supervillain of the same name, he was played by Canadian-American actor Jim Carrey.

Character arc
In this version, Edward Nygma is an eccentric inventor who works at Wayne Enterprises' research and development department who is obsessed with the company's CEO, Bruce Wayne, believing them to be kindred spirits. Nygma invents a device called "the Box" that transmits images directly into the user's mind. He shows his invention to Wayne, who rejects the idea because it "raises too many questions" about privacy and abuse of power. Nygma later discovers that he can utilize neural energy from others with his device to increase his own intelligence, and later develops a way to read minds. After killing his supervisor, Fred Stickley, and staging it as a suicide, he starts sending riddles to Wayne. From the riddles, Wayne's love interest,  Dr. Chase Meridian, correctly diagnoses Wayne's stalker as dangerously insane. It becomes clear that Nygma is seeking to outsmart Wayne before killing him.

Nygma dons the Riddler identity, allies himself with insane crime boss Two-Face, and steals vast amounts of money to fund his own company, Nygmatech, and mass-produce his invention. The devices transfer the stolen information to a gigantic Mother Box on Claw Island, where it is planted in the Riddler's mind. In the process, he learns that Wayne is Batman. He and Two-Face raid Wayne Manor, destroy the Batcave, and kidnap Meridian. True to form, Riddler leaves the last of 4 riddling clues for Bruce Wayne/Batman: If you look at the numbers on my face, you won't find thirteen anyplace (Clock); Tear one off and scratch my head; what once was red is black instead (Match); The eight of us go forth, not back, to protect our King from a foe's attack (Chess pawns); We're five little items of an everyday sort; you'll find us all in "a tennis court" (Vowels A.E.I.O.U). Batman and Alfred discovered that each one had a number in the question itself, appearing in the order of 13, 1, 8, and 5 which represented a letter of the alphabet; 13 being the letter M, 1 being the letter A, 8 being the letter H, and 5 being the letter E; "M, A, H, and E". They then decide that the single digits of 1 and 8 are actually 18 which is the letter R, giving them "M, R, and E," sounding like "Mr. E" then "Mystery" with another name for mystery being "Enigma", revealing the Riddler's true identity of Edward Nygma, and solving the ultimate riddle of the riddles themselves.
Batman in the Batwing and Batman's new crimefighting partner, Robin in a Batboat go to Claw Island where Robin is captured by Two Face. 

In the film's climactic scene, Riddler's compulsion to defeat Batman proves to be his undoing; Batman saves Meridian and Robin and destroys the Mother Box, causing the information in it to overload and flow unregulated into the Riddler's head, damaging his brain irreparably and losing the ability to grasp what is reality or fantasy. The Riddler is locked up in a padded cell in Arkham Asylum, where he now believes that he himself is Batman.

Background
During the early development of the cancelled Catwoman spin-off, Tim Burton expressed his interest in directing the third installment of the Batman film series that began with Batman in 1989. Harvey Dent's transformation into Two-Face was supposed to occur in the film, with Billy Dee Williams reprising his role as Dent from the first film, after the character was deleted in favor of Max Shreck Batman Returns. Along with these, Michelle Pfeiffer was attached to return as Catwoman, Marlon Wayans was attached to star as Robin, and Rene Russo was attached to star as Dr. Chase Meridian. However, when Warner Bros. observed that Batman Returns was just as gloomy as the previous film, they decided to put Joel Schumacher as the director of the third installment, leading to the release of Batman Forever, in which Burton served as producer, without being able to contribute ideas.

Robin Williams was in discussions to be the Riddler at one point but eventually turned down the role, resentful he was used in 1989 as bait for Jack Nicholson to play the Joker, and also because of his contractual issues with Jumanji. In a 2003 interview, Schumacher said Michael Jackson lobbied hard for the role, but was turned down before Jim Carrey was cast. Other actors considered were John Malkovich, Brad Dourif (who was considered before by Burton to portray the Scarecrow), Kelsey Grammer, Matthew Broderick, Phil Hartman, Steve Martin, Mark Hamill (who voices Joker in Batman: The Animated Series), Adam Sandler and Rob Schneider.
 
Schumacher mentioned Tommy Lee Jones as a source of trouble: "Jim Carrey was a gentleman, and Tommy Lee was threatened by him. I'm tired of defending overpaid, overprivileged actors. I pray I don't work with them again." Carrey later acknowledged Jones was not friendly to him, telling him once off-set during the production, "I hate you. I really don't like you ... I cannot sanction your buffoonery."

Will Shortz, crossword puzzle editor for The New York Times, provided the puzzle clues which Riddler leaves for Batman in Batman Forever. Jim Carrey wears a number of flamboyant green spandex catsuits for his role as The Riddler.

Bin Shimada provided the Japanese dubbing for Jim Carrey while Bohdan Tůma provided the Czech dubbing in Batman Forever.

Reception
On Rotten Tomatoes, the site's critical consensus reads, "Loud, excessively busy, and often boring, Batman Forever nonetheless has the charisma of Jim Carrey and Tommy Lee Jones to offer mild relief." Batman Forever received six nominations at the 1996 MTV Movie Awards, four of which were divided between two categories (Carrey and Jones for Best Villain; and Seal's "Kiss from a Rose" and U2's "Hold Me" in Best Song from a Movie). However, it won in just one category—Best Song from a Movie for Seal's "Kiss from a Rose".

Jim Carrey's performance was praised by critics and fans.

Legacy
A song based on the character titled "The Riddler" was performed by rapper Method Man, and was featured on the Batman Forever soundtrack. The Riddler's costume later appears with Two-Face's in the sequel, Batman & Robin, in the background of a scene in Arkham Asylum. The Batman OnStar commercials that aired from 2000 to the beginning of 2002 were based on the Tim Burton and Joel Schumacher films of the 1980s and 1990s, and used aesthetics, props, and settings from the series. Actor Brian Stepanek played the Riddler in one ad.

The video game adaptation of Batman Forever pays homage to the initial confrontation between Batman and Bane in Batman: Knightfall. During the final boss battle, The Riddler initially appears wearing a hulking suit of armor (based upon the costume worn during the film's climax) which gives his physique a muscular appearance akin to that of Bane. As such, Riddler will attack the player with an identical back breaker move to the one seen in Knightfall. However, once the player manages to diminish his health bar, The Riddler's true form will appear, allowing the player to eliminate him.

In Batman #92 by James Tynion IV and Guillem March (June 2020), the Riddler's appearance resembles that of the Carrey version: short red hair, a skin tight green jumpsuit decorated with question marks, and a gold cane.

References

External links

What are the Riddler's riddles in Batman Forever?
Batman: The Riddler Almost Got His Batman Forever Moment
Batman Brings Jim Carrey's Riddler Into DC Comics
The Holographic Fantasies Of Edward Nygma: An Analysis Of Batman Forever
6 Ways Batman Forever Was Ahead of The Curve
Batman Just Turned Jim Carrey's Riddler Into a Serious Villain
In Defense of Jim Carrey's Riddler...
Jim Carrey As The Riddler Again? Here's What He Has To Say
Jim Carrey Compares Batman Villain The Riddler to Sonic Nemesis Dr. Robotnik
Jim Carrey Recalls Batman Forever & Tommy Lee Jones Relationship
Jim Carrey Pays Tribute To ‘Batman Forever’ Director Joel Schumacher
Thirteen best Riddler quotes from Batman Forever
An Extended ‘Batman Forever’ Cut Exists with More Jim Carrey and a Human-Sized Bat
Batman Forever's Biggest Problem Was The Joker
Tommy Lee Jones Hated Working with Jim Carrey on Batman Forever
Tommy Lee Jones Was Mean to Jim Carrey on Batman Forever Set According to Schumacher
Batman Forever - Jim Carrey Online

Film characters introduced in 1995
Action film villains
Male film villains
Batman (1989 film series)
Batman live-action film characters
DC Comics scientists
Fictional murderers
Fictional inventors
Fictional mad scientists
Fictional kidnappers
Fictional scientists in films
Film supervillains
Fictional stalkers
Fictional crime bosses